Rajat Chauhan (born 30 December 1994) is an Indian archer. Chauhan won a silver medal in the World Archery Championships in Copenhagen, becoming the first Indian to win an individual medal in compound archery at the World Championships. He won the Gold Medal Asian Games 2014 in Incheon in the men's compound archery team event along with Abhishek Verma and Sandeep Kumar. In 2014 he also became the first Indian compound archer to qualify for the Archery World Cup final, and in 2015 reached the final of the 2015 World Archery Championships.

Other Achievements 
 2015 Asian Archery Championships: Men's Individual

 2015 Asian Archery Championships: Men's Team

Awards

 Arjuna Award (2016)

References

Living people
Indian male archers
Asian Games medalists in archery
Archers at the 2014 Asian Games
Archers at the 2018 Asian Games
World Archery Championships medalists
Asian Games gold medalists for India
Medalists at the 2014 Asian Games
1994 births
Place of birth missing (living people)
Asian Games silver medalists for India
Medalists at the 2018 Asian Games
Recipients of the Arjuna Award